Eupithecia minutula is a moth in the family Geometridae. It is found in south-western China (Yunnan, Tibet).

The wingspan is about 14–17 mm. The forewings are dark brown and the hindwings are dark brown, but slightly darker along the anal margin.

References

Moths described in 2004
minutula
Moths of Asia